Bonkeng is a poorly known Bantu language of Cameroon.

References

Sawabantu languages
Languages of Cameroon